The 1934 Vanderbilt Commodores football team represented Vanderbilt University as a member of the Southeastern Conference (SEC) during the 1934 college football season. The Commodores were led by Dan McGugin, who served in the 30th and final year as head coach. Vanderbilt went 6–3 overall and 4–3 in the SEC, finishing sixth. They played their six home games at Dudley Field in Nashville, Tennessee. The team's captain was Eugene Beck.

Schedule

References

Vanderbilt
Vanderbilt Commodores football seasons
Vanderbilt Commodores football